James Joseph Gilman   (June 14, 1870 – December 21, 1912) was a professional baseball third baseman who played for the  Cleveland Spiders of the National League in June 1893. His minor league career lasted through 1897.

External links

1870 births
1912 deaths
19th-century baseball players
Baseball players from Ohio
Major League Baseball third basemen
Cleveland Spiders players
Akron Summits players
Atlanta Atlantas players
Richmond Crows players
Dallas Steers players
Norfolk Clams players
Norfolk Crows players
New Haven Texas Steers players
Newark Colts players
Grand Rapids Rippers players
Grand Rapids Gold Bugs players
Paterson Silk Weavers players
Minor league baseball managers